The A-GAME 200 is a NASCAR Xfinity Series stock car race that takes place during the spring at Dover Motor Speedway.

History

The race was broadcast in the United States on ESPN until 2015, when the race moved to Fox. In 2016, the race was moved to the second week of May because of the NASCAR All-Star Race, and was 200 laps in total with two 40 lap heats and 120 lap main as part of the Xfinity 'Dash 4 Cash' program. In 2017, the race would not use the heat races and would utilize NASCAR's new stage format with stages 1 and 2 being 60 laps each, with last stage being the final 80 laps.

The 2020 race was originally scheduled for May 2 before being postponed to August 22 due to the COVID-19 pandemic. As part of a revised track schedule, the race was held the day before the original fall event, also named the Drydene 200.

The 2022 race was held in the month of April for the first time and A-GAME, an energy drink where former MLB player Johnny Damon is the company's chairman of the board, became the title sponsor of the race, replacing Drydene. A-GAME sponsored both driver Jason White and RSS Racing in 2021 and 2022 in the Xfinity Series.

Past winners

2010 and 2011: Races extended due to NASCAR overtime.
2016: Race split into 120 lap feature, preceded by two 40 lap heat races for the Xfinity 'Dash 4 Cash' program.
2020: Race postponed from May 2 to August 22 due to the COVID-19 pandemic.

Multiple winners (drivers)

Multiple winners (teams)

Manufacturer wins

Qualifying race winners

References

External links
 

1982 establishments in Delaware
NASCAR Xfinity Series races
 
Recurring sporting events established in 1982
Annual sporting events in the United States